Miguel Solís Estupiñan (born February 21, 1980) is a professional Colombian and naturalized Salvadoran football player.

References

External links
 Miguel Solís at playmakerstats.com (English version of ceroacero.es)

1980 births
Living people
Footballers from Cali
Naturalized citizens of El Salvador
Salvadoran people of Colombian descent
Association football defenders
Colombian footballers
Deportivo Cali footballers
Cortuluá footballers
Once Municipal footballers
Colombian expatriate footballers
Expatriate footballers in El Salvador